The Sd.Kfz. 4 Gleisketten-Lastkraftwagen ("chain-track truck"), was a 4.5-tonne military truck of Maultier ("mule") half-track family developed during World War II by Germany. Its manufacturer designation was Mercedes-Benz L4500R.

Development
The Sd.Kfz. 4 was developed after the 1941 invasion of the USSR to deal with the ice and mud, which bogged down the wheels-only road-bound commercial vehicles that were used to supply German forces. It was modified Standard Mercedes-Benz L4500S (4x2) with Horstmann suspension instead of a back axle. Another manufacturer of 4.5-t truck, Büssing, planned a similar conversion of its Büssing-NAG L4500S, but did not proceed.

A total of 22,500 Maultier halftracks were produced by 1944, among which 1480 were 4.5-t. Sd.Kfz. 4, others 2-t. Sd.Kfz. 3. In 1943 Opel was ordered to build armored vehicles outfitted with 15 cm Panzerwerfer 42 rocket launchers.  These vehicles were designated Sd.Kfz. 4/1, with around 300 produced. Given the extra weight of the Panzerwerfer, the top speed was only 24 mph (40 km/h).  Another multiple rocket launching system, the 8 cm Raketen-Vielfachwerfer, was also fitted to the Sd.Kfz. 4 chassis.

The vast majority of Maultiers operated using British-pattern Carden-Loyd running gear, with the exception of the Type L4500R, which used PzKpfw. II running gear. The 6-cylinder engines were mated to a transmission with 5 forward / 1 reverse gears and could attain a maximum forward speed of 40 km/h. Each halftrack was equipped with the FuG Spr G f radio.

Aside from the Sd.Kfz. 4/1, the Sd.Kfz. 4 was armed only with a light 7.92 mm MG 34 or MG 42 machine gun with a traverse of 270° and elevation limits of -12° to +80°.

Notes

World War II armoured fighting vehicles of Germany
World War II half-tracks
Half-tracks of Germany
Military vehicles introduced from 1940 to 1944